The 1978–79 Athenian League season was the 56th in the history of Athenian League. The league consisted of 19 teams.

Clubs
The league joined 3 new teams:
 Welling United, from London Spartan League Premier Division
 Dorking Town, from Surrey Senior League
 Fleet Town, from Hampshire League Division Two

League table

References

1978–79 in English football leagues
Athenian League